The Blistock (also spelled Blistögg) is a mountain of the Glarus Alps, overlooking Elm in the canton of Glarus. It lies on the range between the small valley of the Garichtisee and the Sernftal, north of the Kärpf.

It is composed of three summits: the Vorder Blistock (2,405 m), the Mittler Blistock (2,448 m) and the Hinter Blistock (2,446 m).

References

External links
 Blistock on Hikr

Mountains of the Alps
Mountains of Switzerland
Mountains of the canton of Glarus
Two-thousanders of Switzerland